The Port of Lappeenranta (Finnish: Lappeenrannan satama, Swedish: Villmanstrands hamn) is an inland harbour in the city of Lappeenranta, Finland, on the southern shore of Lake Saimaa. It is located in the city centre on the Kaupunginlahti bay, and is therefore also known as the Kaupunginlahti harbour. 

The total number of international passengers (departures and arrivals) was  16,400 in 2018.

There are many operators providing day cruises and water transport services to different parts of Lake Saimaa and connected waterways.

The Kaupunginlahti harbour also used to handle cargo traffic until 1968, when a new facility was built in Mustola, near the northern end of the Saimaa Canal. The Mustola harbour forms part of the overall Port of Lappeenranta.

See also
 Port of Kuopio

References

External links

Ports and harbours of Finland
Water transport in Finland
Buildings and structures in South Karelia
Lappeenranta
Saimaa